or Konobi for short, is a Japanese manga series written and illustrated by Imigimuru. It focuses on the adventures of the members of Tsukimori Middle School's art club, where only Usami Mizuki cares about art at all. The president is always sleeping, while Uchimaki Subaru is only interested in painting his perfect 2D wife, frustrating Usami. The series has been serialized in ASCII Media Works' Dengeki Maoh magazine since October 2012. A 12-episode anime television series adaptation by Feel aired between July and September 2016.

Characters

Main characters

Member of the Art Club who serves as the straight man of the group and probably the only one with common sense. She has feelings for Subaru, but denies it and sometimes covers it up with her tsundere acts.

Member of the Art Club who is not interested in 3D girls and always drawing 2D girls, hoping one day he would find a perfect 2D wife, even though he could easily win any art contest if he tried.

A first-year and a member of the Art Club who has only been in Japan for 6-7 years. She is very curious. Her forehead is sometimes drawn as shiny.

President of the Art Club and a third-year. Despite his position, the only thing he does in the clubroom is sleep.

A transfer student at Subaru's class who instantly becomes popular because of her looks. However, she suffered heavy "chunibyo" case. She shares otaku interests with Subaru, much to Mizuki's jealousy.

Supervisor of the Art Club, although she is inexperienced, she is trying her best to be the Art Club Supervisor.

Others

The President's childhood friend who often comically flirts with him; she calls him "Yō-chan".

The art club's original supervisor and Journalism club's actual supervisor, who passed the job onto Yumeko.

Mizuki's best friend who wears a ribbon on her head.

Mizuki's best friend who is a member of School News Club.

Mizuki's best friend who wears glasses.

A four-year-old girl who initially appeared as a lost child; the granddaughter of Koyama. In Episode 12 of the anime, she is revealed to have been tied to her mother Shizuka with a thick red string to prevent her from wandering off again. It is unknown if Moeka will ever get to be with Mizuki and the Art Club's other members ever again in the future since it is unknown if Shizuka likes Tsukimori Middle School and its Art Club.

Moeka's mother. In Episode 12 of the anime, she is revealed to have her daughter Moeka tied to her with a thick red string to prevent her from wandering off again. It is unknown if Shizuka will ever allow Moeka to be with Mizuki and the Art Club's other members again in the future since it is unknown if she likes Tsukimori Middle School and its Art Club.

Subaru's favorite anime character. Her name Usami is coincidentally the same as Mizuki's last name.

Subaru's older sister.

Media

Manga
This Art Club Has a Problem! is written and illustrated by Imigimuru. It began serialization in ASCII Media Works' Dengeki Maoh magazine with the December 2012 issue, published on October 27, 2012.

Anime
A 12-episode anime adaptation produced by Feel aired between July 7 and September 22, 2016. An insert song titled  featured in episode five is sung by Ari Ozawa, Uesaka and Mizuki. Another insert song titled  by Ozawa as Mizuki Usami is featured in episode 11. The series was released on six Blu-ray and DVD compilation volumes between September 28, 2016 and February 22, 2017. The anime is licensed by Maiden Japan for streaming on Hidive and for an eventual Blu-ray release.

Notes

References

External links
 at Dengeki Maoh 
 at TBS 

Anime series based on manga
Art in anime and manga
ASCII Media Works manga
Comedy anime and manga
Feel (animation studio)
Kadokawa Dwango franchises
Maiden Japan
School life in anime and manga
Seinen manga
TBS Television (Japan) original programming